Chocolate Nunatak is an isolated nunatak of reddish-brown color at the east side of the head of Mariner Glacier,  west-southwest of Mount McCarthy, Barker Range, in Victoria Land, Antarctica. 

The name is descriptive, apparently applied by B.W. Riddolls and G.T. Hancox, geologists with the New Zealand Antarctic Research Program Northern Party to the upper Mariner Glacier in 1966–67. The geographical feature lies on the Pennell Coast, a portion of Antarctica lying between Cape Williams and Cape Adare.

References 

Nunataks of Victoria Land
Pennell Coast